Fossy Church is a medieval church and National Monument in County Laois, Ireland.

Location

History
Fossy Church is thought to date to the late 16th century. The church was remodelled in 1608. Some repair work was carried out in 1903.

Church
The church is rectangular in shape with upstanding walls and gables, with door and window opes, built of uncoursed rubble, with a slight base-batter. A piscina is located in the southeast corner.

References

Religious buildings and structures in County Laois
Archaeological sites in County Laois
National Monuments in County Laois
Former churches in the Republic of Ireland